MSX character sets are a group of single- and double-byte character sets developed by Microsoft for MSX computers. They are based on code page 437.

Character sets 

The following table shows the MSX character set.  Each character is shown with a potential Unicode equivalent if available.  Control characters and other non-printing characters are represented by their names.

Character set differences exist, depending on the target market of the machine. These are the variations:
 Arabic
 Brazilian
 German DIN
 International
 Japanese
 Korean
 Russian

The German DIN and International character sets are identical, apart from the style of zero (0) character. The international character set has a zero with a slash, while the DIN character set has a dotted zero.

The MSX terminal is compatible with VT52 escape codes, plus extra control codes shown below.

Brazilian variants

Gradiente custom charset
The Brazilian manufacturer Gradiente have initially included a modified MSX character set on their v1.0 machines to allow writing correct Portuguese. Differences are shown boxed. The symbol at 0x9E (158) is the currency symbol for the Brazilian cruzado which is not used anymore.

BRASCII

Later Brazilian MSX models (v1.1 or higher) included a standardized character set named BRASCII, which solved the accentuation incompatibility problems amongst the different makers.

References 

Character sets
MSX